This is a list of hillforts in Wales.

Anglesey 

Din Sylwy (Bwrdd Arthur), contour fort
Caer Idris Hillfort, promontory fort
Caer y Twr, partial contour fort
Dinas Gynfor, promontory fort
Dinas Porth Ruffydd, promontory fort
Mynydd Llwydiarth, promontory fort
Parciau hill fort, promontory fort
Tan-y-graig, Llanffinan, contour fort
Twyn-y-Parc, promontory fort
Y Werthyr hillfort, marsh fort
Y Werthyr, Llanddeusant, contour fort
Ynys-y-Fydlyn, promontory fort

Bridgend County Borough 
Cae Summerhouse Camp, partial contour fort
Chapel Hill Camp, Merthyr Mawr House, contour fort
Coed-y-Mwstwr, contour fort
Cwm Llwyd, partial contour fort
Mynydd Twmpathyddaer, contour fort
Mynydd y Gaer, partial contour fort
Pen y Castell, Kenfig Hill, contour fort
Y Bwlwarcau, multiple enclosure hillfort
Y Bwlwarcau, Eastern Enclosure, hillslope fort

Caerphilly County Borough 
Ruperra hill fort, contour fort
Mynydd Twmbarlwm , contour fort, motte and bailey castle Cadw ref MM044

Carmarthenshire

Ceredigion

City and County of Cardiff 
Caerau Hillfort, contour fort
Castle Field Camp, Graig-llwyn, partial contour fort
Llwynda'-ddu, contour fort
Wenallt Camp, hillslope fort

City and County of Swansea 

Berry Wood, hillslope fort
Bishopston Valley Camp, promontory fort
Burry Holms, promontory fort
Carn Nicholas, hillslope fort
Cilifor Top, contour fort
Crawley Rocks, Nicholston Burrows, promontory fort
Deborah's Hole Camp, promontory fort
Fforestnewydd, level terrain fort
Graig Fawr, Pontardulais, contour fort
Gron Gaer, partial contour fort
Harding's Down West Camp, contour fort
Harding's Down, East Camp, partial contour fort
Harding's Down, North Camp, hillslope fort
Hen Gastell, Pen-Clawdd, hillslope fort
High Pennard, promontory fort
Horse Cliff Camp, promontory fort
Lewes Castle Promontory Fort, Rhossili, promontory fort
Llanddewi, Port Eynon, level terrain fort
Llwynheiernin, hillslope fort
Maiden Castle, Oxwich, promontory fort
Old Castle Promontory Fort, Rhossili, promontory fort
Pen-y-gaer, Pen-clawdd, partial contour fort
Redley Cliff Camp, promontory fort
Reynoldston Camp, hillslope fort
Stembridge Hillfort, promontory fort
The Bulwark, Llanmadoc Hill, hillslope fort
Thurba Head, promontory fort
Tor-Gro, level terrain fort
Willoxton Cwm, hillslope fort
Worm's Head, promontory fort
Yellow Top, Paviland, promontory fort

Conwy County Borough 
Braich-y-Ddinas, partial contour fort
Bryn Euryn, partial contour fort
Bryngaer Dinas, contour fort
Caer Bach, partial contour fort
Caer Caradog, partial contour fort
Caer Ddunod, partial contour fort
Castell Caer Seion, contour fort
Cerrig-y-ddinas, Llangelynin, partial contour fort
Dinas Allt Wen, Dwygyfylchi, contour fort
Dinorben, contour fort
Erw Goch Camp, level terrain fort
Mynydd y Gaer, contour fort
Pen y corddyn Mawr, partial contour fort
Pen y Dinas, promontory fort
Pen y Gaer, contour fort
Pen-y-Castell, Maenan, hillslope fort
Tan-y-Gopa, contour fort

Denbighshire 

Bedd-y-Cawr, St Asaph, promontory fort
Caer Drewyn, partial contour fort
Castell Dinas Bran, contour fort
Craig Adwy Wynt, partial contour fort
Craig yr Ychain, partial contour fort
Dinas Melin-y-Wig, contour fort
Foel Fenlli, partial contour fort
Gwernheylod Banks, promontory fort
Moel Fodig, contour fort
Moel Hiraddug, contour fort
Moel y Gaer, Bodfari, partial contour fort
Moel y Gaer, Llanbedr, contour fort
Moel y Gaer, Llantysilio, contour fort
Mynydd Rhyd ddu, contour fort
Pen y Gaer, Efenechtyd, contour fort
Pen y Gaer, Trefor, level terrain fort
Penycloddiau, partial contour fort
Pwll-y-Clai, contour fort
Tan-y-Llan, hillslope fort
Vivod, level terrain fort

Flintshire 
Caer Estyn, contour fort
Glol Camp, contour fort
Moel Arthur, contour fort
Moel Ffagnallt, contour fort
Moel y Gaer, Rhosesmor, contour fort

Gwynedd

Merthyr Tydfil County Borough 
Castell Morlais, contour fort

Monmouthshire 
Blackfield Wood Camp, promontory fort
Cae Camp, contour fort
Caerau Camp, Ponthir, partial contour fort
Coed y Bwnydd Camp, contour fort
Gaer Fawr Camp, Llangwm, contour fort
Gaer Hill Camp, Penterry, contour fort
Gaer hill fort, Trellech, multiple enclosure hillfort
Great House Camp, contour fort
Llancayo Camp, promontory fort
Llanmelin Wood Camp and Llanmelin Outpost, Caerwent, contour fort
Mitchel-troy enclosure, hillslope fort
Pen Twyn, Llanfihangel Crucorney, contour fort
Piercefield Great Camp, partial contour fort
Piercefield Little Camp, level terrain fort
Sudbrook Camp, promontory fort
The Bulwarks, Chepstow, promontory fort
The Larches Camp, contour fort
Twyn y Gaer, Llanfihangel Crucorney, contour fort
Ysgyryd (Skirrid) Fawr, contour fort

Neath Port Talbot County Borough 
Buarth y Gaer, contour fort
Caer Blaen-y-cwm, Margam, hillslope fort
Carn Caca, partial contour fort
Cefn yr Argoed, hillslope fort
Craig Ty-Isaf, partial contour fort
Gaer Fawr Lower Camp, Mynydd y Gaer, partial contour fort
Glyn-Neath, contour fort
Half Moon Camp, Margam, contour fort
Mynydd-y-Castell Camp, Margam, contour fort
Pen y Castell, Cwmafan, contour fort
Warren Hill, Briton Ferry, contour fort

Newport 
Castell Prin, contour fort
Coed-y-Caerau enclosure complex, contour fort
Graig-y-Saeson, partial contour fort
Lodge Wood Camp, contour fort
Rhiwderin Camp, contour fort
St Julian's Wood Camp, Christchurch, hillslope fort
The Mount, Pen-y-Lan, contour fort
Tredegar Fort, contour fort
Wilcrick Hill Camp, contour fort

Pembrokeshire

Powys 

Aberllynfi Gaer, partial contour fort
Afon Tarell, promontory fort
Allt yr Esgair, contour fort
Bausley Hill, partial contour fort
Beacon Ring, contour fort
Black Bank, partial contour fort
Breidden hillfort, contour fort
Bryn Mawr, contour fort
Bryn-y-Saethau, contour fort
Bryngwyn Wood Camp, contour fort
Burfa Castle, contour fort
Bwlch-y-Cibau, contour fort
Caer Din, contour fort
Caer Einon, promontory fort
Caer Fawr, Llanelwedd, promontory fort
Careg-wiber Bank, level terrain fort
Castell Carno, partial contour fort
Castell Dinas, Talgarth, contour fort
Castell-y-Blaidd, contour fort
Castell-y-Dail, partial contour fort
Castle Bank, Glascwm, contour fort
Castle Ring, Old Churchstoke, hillslope fort
Castle Ring, Pen Offa, partial contour fort
Cefn Carnedd, contour fort
Cefn Cyfronydd, contour fort
Cefn Llan, contour fort
Cefn-Du Camp, partial contour fort
Cefn-y-Castell, contour fort
Cefn-y-Coed, hillslope fort
Cefn-yr-Allt, partial contour fort
Cefnllys Castle, contour fort
Clawdd Wood, contour fort
Coed Fennifach, contour fort
Coed Mawr Gaer, contour fort
Coed Pentwyn, partial contour fort
Coed Swydd, hillslope fort
Coed y Caerau, hillslope fort
Coed-y-Gaer, Llanfihangel Cwmdu, partial contour fort
Corn y Fan, contour fort
Craig Rhiwarth, contour fort
Craig y Ddinas, promontory fort
Cross Oak, contour fort
Crowther's Camp, partial contour fort
Crug Hywel, partial contour fort
Cwm Aran, contour fort
Cwm Berwyn, promontory fort
Cwm Cefn-y-Gaer, partial contour fort
Cwm Golog, Kerry, hillslope fort
Dinas, Trefeglwys, partial contour fort
Dol-y-Gaer, promontory fort
Drostre Bank, partial contour fort
Ffinant Isaf, Aberysgir, hillslope fort
Ffridd Faldwyn, Montgomery, contour fort
Ffridd Mathrafal, contour fort
Fron Goch, contour fort
Fron Goth II, contour fort
Fron Haul, promontory fort
Fronderw Wood Camp, hillslope fort
Gaer Fach, Merthyr Cynog, contour fort
Gaer Fawr, Alltarnog, contour fort
Gaer Fawr, Guilsfield, contour fort
Gaer, Glascwm, contour fort
Gallt-y-Gog, contour fort
Gardden Camp, contour fort
Garth Hill enclosure, Nantmel, contour fort
Garth, Nantmel, partial contour fort
Gelli-nedd, partial contour fort
Giant's Bank, contour fort
Glan Frogan, contour fort
Glog Hill Camp, partial contour fort
Gogerddan Camp, contour fort
Graig Fawr Camp, Hundred House, contour fort
Great Cloddiau, partial contour fort
Gwern Ddu Wood, hillslope fort
Hillis Camp, contour fort
Knucklas Castle, contour fort
Lawn Farm, partial contour fort
Llandegley Rocks (East enclosure), contour fort
Llandegley Rocks (West enclosure), contour fort
Llanerch Farm enclosure, contour fort
Llangenny Camp, contour fort
Llanymynech Hill, contour fort
Llethrau Camp, hillslope fort
Llwyn Bryn Dinas, hillfort
Llwyn Celyn, partial contour fort
Llwyn Llwyd, hillslope fort
Llys-y-Cawr (Giant's Hall), partial contour fort
Llysin Hill, contour fort
Lower House Camp, hillslope fort
Lower Ucheldre Camp, contour fort
Moel Bentyrch, contour fort
Moel Dolwen Camp, contour fort
Mynydd Llangorse, promontory fort
Nant Tarthwynni East, hillslope fort
Nant Tarthwynni West, hillslope fort
New Pieces, partial contour fort
Pant Mawr, contour fort
Pant-y-ffridd, promontory fort
Pen Ffawyddog Gaer, hillslope fort
Pen Rhiw Wen, partial contour fort
Pen y Gaer, Dwyriw, contour fort
Pen y Gaer, Llanidloes, partial contour fort
Pen-Llys, partial contour fort
Pen-y-Castell II, partial contour fort
Pen-y-Castell, Kerry, contour fort
Pen-y-Clun, contour fort
Pen-y-Coed, hillslope fort
Pen-y-crug, contour fort
Pen-y-Foel, contour fort
Pen-y-Gaer, Bettws-Cedewain, contour fort
Pen-yr-allt, level terrain fort
Pen'r-Allt, Llanidloes, contour fort
Pendre, Talgarth, promontory fort
Penmyarth Camp, contour fort
Pentre Camp, Llangyniew, contour fort
Pentre Wood, contour fort
Perwlwyn Coppice, partial contour fort
Plas-y-Gaer, hillslope fort
Pwll-y-Rhyd, hillslope fort
Rhyd Uchaf II, promontory fort
Roundton Hill, contour fort
Sibwll Wood Camp, hillslope fort
Slwch Tump, contour fort
Soldier's Mount, Foel, contour fort
Soldiers Ring, Broniarth Hill, contour fort
Tan-y-Clawdd Camp, contour fort
The Whimble, contour fort
Tinboeth Castle, contour fort
Tre Durn Wood, partial contour fort
Trefnanney Gaer, partial contour fort
Twyn Llechfaen, contour fort
Twyn-y-Gaer, contour fort
Twyn-y-Gaer, Garthbrengy, contour fort
Twyn-y-Gaer, Trallwng, partial contour fort
Ty'n y Cwm Camp, partial contour fort
Tyle Clydach, hillslope fort
Welfield Camp, contour fort
Wern Camp, contour fort
Wyle Cop Camp, Caersws, hillslope fort
Y Gaer, Cefn Cloddiau, partial contour fort
Y Gaer, Llandewi Ystradenni, multiple enclosure hillfort
Y Gaer, Pen-pont, contour fort
Y Golfa Camp, promontory fort
Yr Allt, Llangedwyn, hillslope fort
Ystrad Faelog Hillort, promontory fort

Rhondda Cynon Taf 
Caerau, Llantrisant, contour fort
Craig-y-Dinas, Hirwaun, promontory fort
Gwersyll, contour fort
Lle'r Gaer, contour fort
Maendy Camp, contour fort

Vale of Glamorgan 
Bonvilston Gaer, partial contour fort
Caer Dynnaf, contour fort
Castell Moel, Bonvilston, partial contour fort
Castle Ditches, Llancarfan, partial contour fort
Craig Tan-y-Lan, promontory fort
Cwm Bach, Wick, promontory fort
Dinas Powys hillfort, promontory fort
Llanfythin Camp, promontory fort
Llangian Wood Hillfort, hillslope fort
Llantrithyd Camp, hillslope fort
Mynydd Ruthin, hillslope fort
Mynydd-y-Fforest, hillslope fort
Nash Point Camp, promontory fort
St Mary Hill Down, hillslope fort
Sully Island, promontory fort
The Bulwarks, Porthkerry, promontory fort
Westwood Corner, promontory fort

Wrexham County Borough 
Bryn Alun Camp, promontory fort
Bryn-y-Gaer, Broughton, contour fort
Cerrig Gwynion, partial contour fort
Roft Promontory Fort (also known as The Rofft), promontory fort
Y Gardden, Ruabon, contour fort

See also
List of hill forts in England
List of hill forts in Scotland
Scheduled Monuments in Wales

References

Further reading

External links
Hill forts in the Penllyn area
Royal Commission on the Ancient and Historic Monuments of Wales' website
Hillforts Atlas Project – a crowd-sourced project to map the hillforts of Britain and Ireland

 
Lists of buildings and structures in Wales
Wales
Welsh military-related lists